The men's competition in the –56 kg division was held on 21 October 2013 in Centennial Hall, Wrocław, Poland.

Schedule

Medalists

Records

Results

References

Results 
Results

2013 World Weightlifting Championships